Busbridge War Memorial is a First World War memorial in the churchyard of St John's Church in village of Busbridge in Surrey, south-eastern England. Designed by Sir Edwin Lutyens, it is Grade II* listed.

Background
In the aftermath of the First World War and its unprecedented casualties, thousands of war memorials were built across Britain. Amongst the most prominent designers of memorials was the architect Sir Edwin Lutyens, described by Historic England as "the leading English architect of his generation". Lutyens designed the Cenotaph on Whitehall in London, which became the focus for the national Remembrance Sunday commemorations, as well as the Thiepval Memorial to the Missing—the largest British war memorial anywhere in the world—and the Stone of Remembrance which appears in all large Commonwealth War Graves Commission cemeteries and in several of Lutyens's civic war memorials. Busbridge's memorial is one of fifteen War Crosses by Lutyens, all sharing a broadly similar design, and one of several of Lutyens' works in the village.

Lutyens' connection with Busbridge originated through Gertrude Jekyll, a garden designer with whom Lutyens established a long-running friendship and professional partnership. He designed her house at Munstead Wood on the outskirts of the village in 1896 to complement the garden she had built and the pair worked together on several garden and country house projects, particularly in the local area. Lutyens went on to design several memorials to members of the Jekyll family, which stand in the same churchyard as the war memorial and a chancel screen in the church itself. Lutyens established his reputation as an architect designing country houses for wealthy clients; Busbridge is one of several of his war memorial commissions which apparently resulted from pre-war clients and associates.

History and design

Busbridge War Memorial was unveiled at a ceremony on 23 July 1922 by General Sir Charles Monro, 1st Baronet.

The cross stands on a base of four uneven rectangular stone blocks which itself stands on an undercut square plinth, at the foot of which are three shallow stone steps. Its position at the end of the churchyard, on the junction of Brighton Road and Hambledon Road makes it a prominent landmark.

The largest stone at the base of the cross bears the memorial's inscription: MCMXIV–MCMXIX / THEY COUNTED NOT / THEIR LIVES DEAR / UNTO THEMSELVES; the dates of the Second World War (MCMXXXIX–MCMXXXXV) were added at a later date below the first inscription. No names are inscribed on the memorial itself; these are instead recorded on a plaque inside the church.

The memorial was designated a grade II listed building on 1 February 1991. Three other memorials by Lutyens stand in the same churchyard—to Julia Jekyll (Gertrude's mother, died 1895); Francis McLaren MP (died 1917), who is commemorated on Lutyens' Spalding War Memorial; and a joint memorial to Gertrude, her brother Sir Herbert Jekyll, and his wife Dame Agnes Jekyll (died 1932–1937); all are grade II listed. The war memorial has significant group value with the other memorials and with St John's Church, which is itself a grade II* listed building.

In November 2015, as part of the commemorations of the centenary of the First World War, Lutyens's war memorials were recognised as a "national collection" and all of his free-standing memorials in England were listed or had their listing status reviewed and their National Heritage List for England list entries were updated and expanded. As part of this process, the Busbridge memorial was upgraded from grade II to grade II*.

See also
Grade II* listed buildings in Waverley, Surrey
Grade II* listed war memorials in England

References

World War I memorials in England
World War II memorials in England
Monuments and memorials in Surrey
Grade II* listed monuments and memorials
Grade II* listed buildings in Surrey
Busbridge, Surrey
Works of Edwin Lutyens in England
War memorials by Edwin Lutyens
1922 sculptures
Military history of Surrey